Al-Amqiyah al-Tahta is a village in northern Syria, administratively part of the Hama Governorate, located northwest of Hama. It is situated in the Ghab plain Nearby localities include al-Huwash to the south, Nabl al-Khatib to the southwest, Farikah to the west, al-Ziyarah to the northwest and al-Ankawi to the north. According to the Syria Central Bureau of Statistics, al-Amqiyah al-Tahta had a population of 3,300 in the 2004 census.

References

Populated places in al-Suqaylabiyah District
Populated places in al-Ghab Plain